Phtheochroa is a large genus of tortrix moths (family Tortricidae). It belongs to the tribe Cochylini of subfamily Tortricinae.

Species
The currently recognized species of Phtheochroa are:

 Phtheochroa aarviki Razowski & J.W. Brown, 2012
 Phtheochroa aegrana (Walsingham, 1879)
 Phtheochroa agelasta (Razowski, 1967)
 Phtheochroa albiceps (Walsingham, 1914)
 Phtheochroa amphibola Razowski, 1994
 Phtheochroa annae Huemer, 1989
 Phtheochroa aureoalbida (Walsingham, 1895)
 Phtheochroa aureopunctana (Ragonot, 1894)
 Phtheochroa baracana (Busck, 1907)
 Phtheochroa birdana (Busck, 1907)
 Phtheochroa canariana (Barnes & Busck, 1920)
 Phtheochroa cartwrightana (Kearfott, 1907)
 Phtheochroa chalcantha (Meyrick, 1912)
 Phtheochroa chaunax Razowski, 1991
 Phtheochroa chlidantha Razowski, 1994
 Phtheochroa chriacta Razowski, 1991
 Phtheochroa chriodes Razowski, 1991
 Phtheochroa ciona Razowski, 1991
 Phtheochroa circina Razowski, 1991
 Phtheochroa cistobursa Razowski, 1991
 Phtheochroa cymatodana (Rebel, 1927)
 Phtheochroa decipiens (Walsingham, 1900)
 Phtheochroa deima Razowski, 1994
 Phtheochroa descensa Razowski, 1991
 Phtheochroa dodrantaria (Razowski, 1970)
 Phtheochroa drenowskyi (Rebel, 1916)
 Phtheochroa duponchelana (Duponchel in Godart, 1843)
 Phtheochroa durbonana (Lhomme, 1937)
 Phtheochroa ecballiella Huemer, 1989
 Phtheochroa eulabea Razowski, 1994
 Phtheochroa exasperantana (Christoph, 1872)
 Phtheochroa farinosana (Herrich-Schäffer, 1856)
 Phtheochroa faulkneri Razowski, 1991
 Phtheochroa frigidana (Guenee, 1845)
 Phtheochroa fulvicinctana (Constant, 1894)
 Phtheochroa fulviplicana (Walsingham, 1879)
 Phtheochroa gigantica (Busck, 1920)
 Phtheochroa gracillimana (Rebel, 1910)
 Phtheochroa huachucana (Kearfott, 1907)
 Phtheochroa hyboscia Razowski, 1991
 Phtheochroa hydnum Razowski, 1991
 Phtheochroa imitana Derra, 1992
 Phtheochroa ingridae Huemer, 1990
 Phtheochroa inopiana (Haworth, [1811])
 Phtheochroa iodes (Clarke, 1968)
 Phtheochroa issikii (Razowski, 1977)
 Phtheochroa jerichoana (Amsel, 1935)
 Phtheochroa johnibrowni Razowski, 1991
 Phtheochroa kenneli (Obraztsov, 1944)
 Phtheochroa kenyana Aarvik, 2010
 Phtheochroa krulikowskiji (Obraztsov, 1944)
 Phtheochroa larseni Huemer, 1990
 Phtheochroa lonnvei Aarvik, 2010
 Phtheochroa loricata (Razowski, 1984)
 Phtheochroa lucentana (Kennel, 1899)
 Phtheochroa melasma (Clarke, 1968)
 Phtheochroa meraca (Razowski, 1984)
 Phtheochroa modestana (Busck, 1907)
 Phtheochroa natalica Razowski, 2005
 Phtheochroa noctivaga (Razowski, 1984)
 Phtheochroa noema Razowski, 1991
 Phtheochroa obnubila (Razowski, 1984)
 Phtheochroa ochodea Razowski, 1991
 Phtheochroa ochralana (Chretien, 1915)
 Phtheochroa ochrobasana (Chretien, 1915)
 Phtheochroa osthelderi Huemer, 1989
 Phtheochroa palpana (Ragonot, 1894)
 Phtheochroa pecosana Kearfott, 1907
 Phtheochroa perspicuana (Barnes & Busck, 1920)
 Phtheochroa piptmachaeria Razowski, 1986
 Phtheochroa pistrinana (Erschoff, 1877)
 Phtheochroa primula (Walsingham, 1914)
 Phtheochroa procerana (Lederer, 1863)
 Phtheochroa pulvillana (Herrich-Schäffer, 1851)
 Phtheochroa purana (Guenee, 1845)
 Phtheochroa purissima (Osthelder, 1938)
 Phtheochroa quaesita (Razowski, 1984)
 Phtheochroa rafalskii Razowski, 1997
 Phtheochroa rectangulana (Chretien, 1915)
 Phtheochroa reisseri (Razowski, 1970)
 Phtheochroa retextana (Erschoff, 1874)
 Phtheochroa riscana (Kearfott, 1907)
 Phtheochroa rugosana
 Phtheochroa schreibersiana (Frölich, 1828)
 Phtheochroa schreieri Derra, 1992
 Phtheochroa simoniana (Staudinger, 1859)
 Phtheochroa sinecarina Huemer, 1989
 Phtheochroa sociana (Esartiya, 1988)
 Phtheochroa sodaliana (Haworth, [1811])
 Phtheochroa subfumida (Falkovitsh, 1963)
 Phtheochroa superbissima (Razowski, 1984)
 Phtheochroa syrtana Ragonot, 1888
 Phtheochroa terminana (Busck, 1907)
 Phtheochroa thiana (Staudinger, 1900)
 Phtheochroa tubulata Arenberger, 1997
 Phtheochroa undulata (Danilevsky in Danilevsky, Kuznetsov & Falkovitsh, 1962)
 Phtheochroa unionana (Kennel, 1900)
 Phtheochroa variolosana Christoph in Romanoff, 1887
 Phtheochroa veirsi Razowski, 1986
 Phtheochroa vicina (Walsingham, 1914)
 Phtheochroa villana (Busck, 1907)
 Phtheochroa vitellinana (Zeller, 1875)
 Phtheochroa vulneratana (Zetterstedt, 1839)
 Phtheochroa waracana (Kearfott, 1907)
 Phtheochroa weiserti Arenberger, 1997
 Phtheochroa zacualpana (Busck, 1913)
 Phtheochroa zerena Razowski & Becker, 1993

Footnotes

References
 Baixeras, J.; Brown, J.W. & Gilligan, T.M. (2009a): Online World Catalogue of the Tortricidae – Genus Phtheochroa account. Version 1.3.1. Retrieved January 20, 2009.
Baixeras, J.; Brown, J.W. & Gilligan, T.M. (2009b): Online World Catalogue of the Tortricidae – Phtheochroa species list. Version 1.3.1. Retrieved January 20, 2009.

Further reading 

 Aarvik, L., 2010: Review of East African Cochylini (Lepidoptera, Tortricidae) with description of new species. Norwegian Journal of Entomology 57 (2): 81-108.
 Brown, J.W., 2005: World Catalogue of Insects vol. 5 Tortricidae.
 Derra, D. 1990: Neue Tortriciden aus der Türkei. Atalanta 21 (3/4): 295-300.
 Razowski, J., 2011: Diagnoses and remarks on genera of Tortricidae, 2: Cochylini (Lepidoptera: Tortricidae). Shilap Revista de Lepidopterologia 39 (156): 397-414.
 Razowski, J.; Brown, J.W. 2012: Descriptions of new Tortricidae (Lepidoptera) reared from native fruit in Kenya. Zootaxa, 3222: 1–27. Preview PDF
 Stephens, 1829, A Systematic Catalogue of British Insects 2: 191

 
Cochylini
Tortricidae genera